U29 or U-29 may refer to

 German submarine U-29, one of several German submarines
 Utah State Route 29
 Hillersjö stone, Swedish runestone in Uppland